Cheriyo is a Sri Lankan film series centered on a series of comedy action films, produced by TK Films and RS Films and distributed by EAP cinema theaters.

Overview
The franchise consists of four films in the Cheriyo series, Cheriyo Doctor (1991), Cheriyo Captain (1995), Cheriyo Darling (1996) and Cheriyo Holman (2002). The first three films of the franchise was directed by Roy de Silva with his screenplay and dialogues. The film Cheriyo Doctor was produced by Thilak Atapattu for TK Films, cinematography by S. A. Gafoor and edited by S. V. Chandran. The second film Cheriyo Captain was produced again by Thilak Atapattu, cinematography by G. Nandasena and edited by Densil Jayaweera. Third film Cheriyo Darling was co-produced by director Roy de Silva with his wife Sumana Amarasinghe for Roy-Sumana Films (RS Films). The film cinematography done by J.J. Yogaraja and edited by Densil Jayaweera. The final film of the franchise, Cheriyo Holman was directed by Parakrama Jayasinghe and co-produced by Raj Ranasinghe and Thilak Atapattu. Cinematography by G. Nandasena and edited by M. S. Aliman. All four films were music directed by Somapala Rathnayake.

History

Timeline

Films

Cheriyo Doctor (1991)

Cheriyo Doctor, centering on the incidents occur within a mental hospital run by Professor. Incidents starts when Nurse Surangi falls in love with one of fake patient Chaminda Randenigala. After series of comedy incidents, Chaminda's friend Nalin also attended to the hospital with fake illness and Chaminda's realized that his sister Madhu falls in love with Nalin. However, Chaminda's mother Nayana Randenigala opposes their romantic behaviors and locked Madhu. With the help of hospital staff, Chaminda and Nalin fight against Nayana's thugs and win their fiancees.

Cheriyo Captain (1995)

Cheriyo Captain, centering on the incidents occur between an army group and a guerrilla group. Army group led by Captain Doson commands seven funny soldiers - Huntin, Ping Pong, Bantum, Kang Kung, Pabul, Tom Tom accompany with Tarzan. Guerrilla group led by Alphonsus who kidnap Varuni, only daughter of General Tagore. Captain Doson has informed to rescue Varuni and bring the guerrillas down. Along the course, Varuni's boyfriend Rahal and his friend joined the army troop at the jungle. After series of comedy events, army troop rescued Varuni and meantime destroy the bridge that connect the Army territory and Alphosus territory.

Cheriyo Darling (1996)

Cheriyo Darling, centering on the incidents occur when a popular actress Miss Sweetie attends to the mental hospital run by Professor. All the male workers at the hospital start to flirt around her to win her heart. Meanwhile, Sweetie's boyfriend enters to the hospital with a fake mental illness. However, after series of comedy incidents Gulliver and his henchman rushed to the hospital and looking to kidnap Miss Sweeties. With the final battle initiated by hotel workers, Gulliver flees with his troop and Miss Sweetie joins with her boyfriend and leave the hospital.

Cheriyo Holman (2002)

Cheriyo Darling is set in a hotel. Many people visit the hotel and reserve their rooms. Meanwhile the hotel is haunted by a ghost, "Mohini" (Dilhani) and all people are afraid of her horror incidents. Further information about the ghost is exhibited in the last part of the film. Until that moment, the film revolves around comedic incidents as well as hotel workers flirting with a beautiful girl, later known as the ghost.

Cast and characters

Technical crew

Soundtracks

Cheriyo Doctor

Cheriyo Captain

Cheriyo Darling

References

External links
 
 
 
 

Film series introduced in 1991
Comedy film series
Sri Lankan comedy films